Más Romántico Que Nadie is the eighth studio album by Salvadoran singer Álvaro Torres, released on 1987 through WEA Records. It was produced by produced by Enrique Elizondo and it was recorded in George Tobin Studios, North Hollywood, CA.

The album was a success in Latin America and the United States, peaking at number 8 in December 1987 on the Billboard Latin Pop Albums chart. The single "Hazme Olvidarla" became the biggest hit from this album, reaching the 7 position on Billboard Hot Latin Tracks.

Track listing

Personnel 
Credits adapted from Más Romántico Que Nadie liner notes.

Vocals

 Álvaro Torres – lead vocals

Musicians

 David White – arrangements

Production

 Enrique Elizondo – production
Bill Smith – recording

Recording

 Recorded at George Tobin Studios, North Hollywood, CA

Charts

Weekly charts

Year-end charts

References 

1987 albums
Álvaro Torres albums